Nikolas Proesmans (born 11 May 1992 in Tongeren) is a Belgian midfielder who plays for A. C. Sangiustese.

Career statistics

Club

Honours
Újpest
Magyar Kupa: 2013–14

References

External links
 Player profile at HLSZ 
 Player profile at MLSZ 
 
 
 

1992 births
Living people
People from Tongeren
Belgian footballers
Belgian expatriate footballers
Association football midfielders
Sint-Truidense V.V. players
Újpest FC players
FC Ararat Yerevan players
A.C. Ancona players
Belgian Pro League players
Nemzeti Bajnokság I players
Nemzeti Bajnokság II players
Armenian Premier League players
Serie D players
Expatriate footballers in Hungary
Expatriate footballers in Armenia
Expatriate footballers in Italy
Belgian expatriate sportspeople in Hungary
Belgian expatriate sportspeople in Italy
Footballers from Limburg (Belgium)
A.C. Sangiustese players